The men's parallel bars competition was one of eight events for male competitors in artistic gymnastics at the 1960 Summer Olympics in Rome. It was held on 5, 7, and 10 September at the Baths of Caracalla. There were 129 competitors from 28 nations, with nations in the team competition having up to 6 gymnasts and other nations entering up to 2 gymnasts. The event was won by Boris Shakhlin of the Soviet Union, the nation's second consecutive victory in the men's parallel bars (tying Germany for second-most all-time). Giovanni Carminucci earned Italy's first medal in the event since 1932 with his silver. Takashi Ono of Japan took bronze for a second consecutive Games, making him the fourth man to win multiple medals in the event.

The 1960 gymnastics competitions introduced apparatus finals, with the all-around competition serving as a qualifying round for the parallel bars final.

Background

This was the 10th appearance of the event, which is one of the five apparatus events held every time there were apparatus events at the Summer Olympics (no apparatus events were held in 1900, 1908, 1912, or 1920). Seven of the top 12 (including ties for 8th) gymnasts from 1956 returned: bronze medalists Takashi Ono and Masao Takemoto of Japan, fifth-place finisher Albert Azaryan of the Soviet Union, sixth-place finisher Nobuyuki Aihara of Japan, and eighth-place finishers Yury Titov and Boris Shakhlin of the Soviet Union and Olavi Leimuvirta of Finland. Shakhlin had won the 1958 world championship, with Ono the runner-up.

Morocco and South Korea each made their debut in the men's parallel bars; the short-lived United Arab Republic made its only appearance. The United States made its ninth appearance, most of any nation, having missed only the inaugural 1896 Games.

Competition format

The gymnastics all-around events continued to use the aggregation format. Each nation entered a team of six gymnasts or up to two individual gymnasts. All entrants in the gymnastics competitions performed both a compulsory exercise and a voluntary exercise for each apparatus. The scores for all 12 exercises were summed to give an individual all-around score.

These exercise scores were also used for qualification for the new apparatus finals. The two exercises (compulsory and voluntary) for each apparatus were summed to give an apparatus score; the top 6 in each apparatus participated in the finals; others were ranked 7th through 129th. For the apparatus finals, the all-around score for that apparatus was multiplied by one-half then added to the final round exercise score to give a final total.

Exercise scores ranged from 0 to 10, with the final total apparatus score from 0 to 20.

Schedule

All times are Central European Time (UTC+1)

Results

References

Official Olympic Report
www.gymnasticsresults.com
www.gymn-forum.net

Men's parallel bars
Men's 1960
Men's events at the 1960 Summer Olympics